The 22 May Stadium is a multi-purpose stadium in Aden, Yemen. It is primarily used for football matches, and serves as the home stadium of Al-Tilal. It has also been used for boxing. The stadium was mostly destroyed in 2015 during the Yemeni Civil War.

References

External links
World Stadiums - Yemen

Football venues in Yemen